The Jura–Simplon Railways (JS), (French: Compagnie des Chemins de Fer Jura–Simplon) was a railway company that was formed in 1890. It was nationalised in 1903 as the largest railway company in Switzerland and integrated into the Swiss Federal Railways (SBB).

History

The Jura–Simplon Railways was a railway company, which was formed from the 1890 merger of the two most important western Swiss railway companies, the Jura–Bern–Lucerne Railway (JBL), including the Gümligen–Lucerne line belonging to the canton of Bern, and the Western Swiss Railways (Chemins de fer de la Suisse Occidentale; SOS). The Federal Government also participated in the merger by means of a voluntary share purchase. The Pont–Vallorbe Railway (Chemin de fer Pont–Vallorbe), operated by the SOS, was purchased on 1 January 1891.

The share capital of the new company was formed of Swiss francs (CHF) 52 million of preferred stock and CHF 34 million of common stock. The preferred shares comprised 38 million existing JBL shares and 14 million SOS shares. The nominal value of an SOS ordinary share was reduced from CHF 500 to 200 and the amount of CHF 52.4 million exempted from the stock reconstruction was applied to depreciation. The Swiss government was given the right to repurchase the JS.

Construction of the Simplon Tunnel

Although the Jura-Simplon Railway was a railway company for only 13 years, it helped break the impasse over the building of the Simplon Tunnel from Brig to Iselle in Italy after decades of effort by Bern and Romandy. Studies prepared to support the construction of the tunnel had already been submitted by the SOS to the federal and cantonal authorities. In 1891, JS, as a new entrepreneurial railway company, presented the Federal Council with a definitive project for the Simplon Tunnel.
 
On 25 November 1895, a treaty was signed with Italy for the construction of what would be the longest tunnel in the world. The construction costs for the single-track tunnel were estimated at CHF 58,820,000. The treaty  obliged Switzerland to provide funding of CHF 15 million and Italy to provide funding of CHF 4 million. Italy was represented by four directors on the JS board. Construction began on the 19,803-metre-long tunnel in 1898. The tunnel was the longest railway tunnel in the world until the opening of the Seikan Tunnel in 1988.

Operations

The Jura–Simplon Railways operated several other railway lines:
 Jougne–Vallorbe–Pontarlier line and Verrières–Pontarlier line of the French Chemins de fer de Paris à Lyon et à la Méditerranée (PLM)
 Bière–Apples–Morges railway (BAM)
 Bödelibahn (BB; from 1895)
 Bulle–Romont railway (BR)
 Cossonay–Gare–Ville funicular (CG)
 Fribourg–Ins railway (Chemin de fer Friborg-Morat-Anet, FMA)
 Neuchâtel–Le Locle-Col-des-Roches railway (Jura neuchâtelois; JN)
 Pont–Brassus Railway (PBr)
 Pont–Vallorbe Railway (PV)
 Travers–Buttes railway (Régional du Val-de-Travers; RVT)
 Spiez-Erlenbach Railway (SEB)
 Lake Thun Railway (Thunerseebahn; TSB)
 Visp-Zermatt Railway (VZ)
 Yverdon–Ste-Croix railway (YSteC)
 

On 14 June 1891, the Jura–Simplon Railways suffered the Münchenstein rail disaster, the worst railway accident in Swiss history. The railway bridge over the Birs, which was built by Gustave Eiffel, collapsed below the village of Münchenstein under a train from Basel. Three carriages and the two locomotives crashed into the flooded Birs. 78 people were killed and 131 were injured. A soldier died of injuries sustained during the cleanup. The accident led to a stricter supervision of the railways. The railway bridges were systematically examined and the first building standards were created.
 
In the Zollikofen train crash on 17 August 1891 in Zollikofen, a Bern–Paris express ran into an "extra" (not listed in the timetable) train waiting at a red home signal. The impact killed 14 passengers and injured 122 on the extra train. The accident was caused by mistakes at various operating points. The express has been released to run through an occupied section. A deactivated air brake also reduced the braking effect.
 
Despite investing in the construction of the Simplon tunnel, JS was able to pay a dividend every year.

Posters
Thee Jura-Simplon Railway advertised with a series of posters. Some of them were designed by Hugo d’Alési.

Nationalisation
During the construction of the Simplon tunnel, the national referendum of 20 February 1898 agreed to the nationalisation the Jura-Simplon railway and the other four main railways. The Jura-Simplon Railway was taken over by the Swiss Federal Railways (SBB) on 1 May 1903 and it completed the Simplon Tunnel in 1906.

Graphic summary 
Overview of the history of the Jura–Simplon Railways (T: takeover):

Infrastructure and vehicles

Stations

Network

The route network of 937 km ran from Basel, Geneva and the Jura border crossings of Delle, La Chaux-de-Fonds, Les Verrières and Vallorbe to Brig and Lucerne.  In addition, the narrow-gauge Brünig Railway from Lucerne to Brienz was part of the 937 km-long route network. It consisted of the combined lines of its predecessor railways:
 the lines of the Jura-Bern-Lucerne
 the lines of the Western Swiss Railways
 the Pont–Vallorbe Railway

Duplication 

The Jura-Simplon Railway continued the track duplication of its predecessors. When SBB took over JS in 1903, 131.20 km (14%) of the network was duplicated.

Rolling stock 
The Jura-Simplon Railway named their rolling stock according to the then nationwide classification system.

The JS operated the following locomotives. The class name that was valid from 1902 is listed in brackets.

References

Notes

Footnotes

Sources
 
 
 
 
 

Defunct railway companies of Switzerland
1903 disestablishments in Switzerland
Swiss companies established in 1890
Railway companies established in 1890
Railway companies disestablished in 1903